Syria, officially known as the Syrian Arab Republic, first participated at the Olympic Games in 1948, when the diver Zouheir Al-Shourbagi was the sole competitor at the 1948 London games and placed 10th in the men's platform. Syria then missed the next four Olympiads (though in 1960 the nation competed with Egypt as part of the United Arab Republic). Syria returned to the Games in 1968, and has sent athletes to compete in all but one Summer Olympic Games except, when they missing the 1976 Games and has never participated in the Winter Olympic Games.

The National Olympic Committee of Syria was created in 1948 and recognized by the International Olympic Committee (IOC) on 31 January 1948, at the IOC Session in Sankt Moritz. Syrian athletes have won a total of four medals, in four sports: Athletics, Freestyle wrestling, Weightlifting and Boxing.

Medal tables

Medals by Summer Games

Medals by sport

List of medalists

Flagbearers

See also
 List of flag bearers for Syria at the Olympics
 :Category:Olympic competitors for Syria
 Syrian Olympic Committee

External links